Boughey is a surname. Notable people with the surname include:

Darren Boughey (born 1970), English footballer
Joseph Boughey (1873–1935), English footballer
Peter Boughey (1911–1986), British Army officer
Robert Boughey (born 1940), American architect
Stanley Boughey (1896–1917), British Army officer
Boughey baronets

See also
Boughen